Circinella is a genus of fungi belonging to the family Syncephalastraceae.  It was first described by Philippe Édouard Léon Van Tieghem & (Alexandre Alexis) George Le Monnier in 1873.

The genus has cosmopolitan distribution.

Species:
 Circinella angarensis 
 Circinella chinensis 
 Circinella glomerata

References

Fungi
Taxa described in 1873
Taxa named by Philippe Édouard Léon Van Tieghem
Fungus genera